Baileyton may refer to:

Baileyton, Alabama
Baileyton, Tennessee